The Russian Women's Handball Super Cup is a trophy that is played at the beginning of each season between the champion of Russia of the previous season and the winner of the Russian Cup of the previous season. If the champion and the Cup holder are the same team, then the Cup finalist plays with the champion. The trophy is held by the Russian Handball Federation and consists of one match. The trophy was played for the first time in 2014. Currently, the title sponsor of the tournament is the Olympus bookmaker, having replaced the VKontakte social network in 2018.

Winners list
The champions of Russia of the previous season are highlighted in pale blue

References

External links
 https://rushandball.ru/competitions

Handball competitions in Russia
Handball in Russia